The 1938 Brown Bears football team represented Brown University as an independent during the 1938 college football season. Led by 13th-year head coach Tuss McLaughry, the Bears compiled a record of 5–3.

Schedule

References

Brown
Brown Bears football seasons
Brown Bears football